The 1990 East Coast Conference men's basketball tournament was held March 3–5, 1990.  The champion gained and an automatic berth to the NCAA tournament.

Bracket and results

{{8TeamBracket
| group1 =
| group2 =

| RD1=QuarterfinalsSaturday, March 3
| RD2=SemifinalsSunday, March 4
| RD3=FinalMonday, March 5

| RD1-seed1  = 1
| RD1-team1  = Towson State
| RD1-score1 = 74
| RD1-seed2  = 8
| RD1-team2  = 
| RD1-score2 = 63

| RD1-seed3  = 4
| RD1-team3  = | RD1-score3 = 57| RD1-seed4  = 5
| RD1-team4  = 
| RD1-score4 = 54

| RD1-seed5  = 3
| RD1-team5  = | RD1-score5 = 76| RD1-seed6  = 6
| RD1-team6  = Drexel
| RD1-score6 = 75

| RD1-seed7  = 2
| RD1-team7  = 
| RD1-score7 = 67
| RD1-seed8  = 7
| RD1-team8  = | RD1-score8 = 72| RD2-seed1  = 1
| RD2-team1  = Towson State| RD2-score1 = 85| RD2-seed2  = 4
| RD2-team2  = Delaware
| RD2-score2 = 71

| RD2-seed3  = 3
| RD2-team3  = Lehigh| RD2-score3 = 73| RD2-seed4  = 7
| RD2-team4  = Bucknell
| RD2-score4 = 67

| RD3-seed1  = 1
| RD3-team1  = Towson State| RD3-score1 = 73'| RD3-seed2  = 3
| RD3-team2  = Lehigh
| RD3-score2 = 60
}}

* denotes overtime game

All-Tournament Team
 Devin Boyd, Towson State
 Bob Krizansky, Lafayette
 Scott Layer, Lafayette
 Kurk Lee, Towson State – Tournament MVP''
 Dozie Mbonu, Lafayette

Source

References

East Coast Conference (Division I) men's basketball tournament
Tournament